Romanticised outlaws are stock characters found in a number of fictional settings.

This was particularly so in the United States, where outlaws were popular subjects of newspaper coverage and stories in the 19th century, and 20th century fiction and Western films.  Thus, "outlaw" is still commonly used to mean those violating the law or, by extension, those living that lifestyle, whether actual criminals evading the law or those merely opposed to "law-and-order" notions of conformity and authority (such as the "outlaw country" music movement in the 1970s).

The colloquial sense of an outlaw as bandit or brigand is the subject of a monograph by British author Eric Hobsbawm: Hobsbawm's book discusses the bandit as a symbol, and mediated idea, and many of the outlaws he refers to, such as Ned Kelly, Mr. Dick Turpin, and Billy the Kid, are also listed below.

List of famous outlaws

The stereotype owes a great deal to English folklore precedents, in the tales of Robin Hood and of gallant highwaymen.  But outlawry was once a term of art in the law, and one of the harshest judgments that could be pronounced on anyone's head.

American

American Western

The outlaw is familiar to contemporary readers as an archetype in Western films, depicting the lawless expansionism period of the United States in the late 19th century. The Western outlaw is typically a criminal who operates from a base in the wilderness, and opposes, attacks or disrupts the fragile institutions of new settlements.  By the time of the Western frontier, many jurisdictions had abolished the process of outlawry, and the term was used in its more popular meaning. Some Old West outlaws, such as Billy the Kid and Jesse James, became legendary figures in Western lore both in their own lifetime and long after their deaths.

Argentinian
 Juan Bautista Bailoretto
 Juan Moreira
 Mate Cocido (Segundo David Peralta)

Brazilian
Cangaceiros
 Lampião – Brazilian outlaw who led the Cangaços, a band of feared marauders and outlaws who terrorized Northeastern Brazil during the 1920–1930's.

Canadian
 Simon Gunanoot
 Slumach
 Bill Miner 
 Ken Leishman – In 1966 he managed to hijack $383,497 worth of gold from the Winnipeg International Airport, amounting to the largest gold heist in Canadian history.

Mexican
 Doroteo Arango Arámbula – Better known as Pancho Villa, a general in the Mexican Revolution
 Heraclio Bernal, also known as the "Thunderbolt of Sinaloa"
 Los Plateados, a famous Mexican gang that was active in the state of Morelos in the 19th century.
 Joaquín Murrieta, symbolized resistance against Anglo-American economic and cultural domination in the 19th century.

Panamanian
 Derienni

European

British
 Robin Hood – Legendary Medieval English outlaw
 Hereward the Wake – Saxon outlaw during the Norman conquest of England
 John Nevison – 17th century highwayman
 William Plunkett – English highwayman
 Tom King – fictional English highwayman
 Edgar the Outlaw – English king
 Eustace Folville – English outlaw and soldier
 Adam the Leper – 14th-century English gang-leader
 James Hind – 17th century highwayman
 John Clavell – English highwayman, author, and lawyer
 Claude Duval – French-born highwayman in England
 John Wilkes – 18th century English politician
 Twm Siôn Cati – Welsh Outlaw from Tregaron in Tudor times, ended up mayor of Brecon
 Sir William Wallace – Scottish Outlaw
 James MacLaine – Scottish highwayman
 Sawney Beane – Scottish outlaw
 The Outlaw Murray – The Outlaw of Ettrick Forest in the Scottish Borders
 Rob Roy MacGregor – Scottish Chieftain.

Croatian
Hajduci
 Mijat Tomić
 Andrijica Šimić

Czech/Slovak
 Juraj Jánošík
 Rumcajs

French
 Louis Dominique Bourguignon, also known as Cartouche

German
 Eppelein von Gailingen
 Frederick of Isenberg
 Hannikel
 Johannes Bückler, nicknamed Schinderhannes
 Matthias Klostermayr, a.k.a. Bavarian Hiasl, a.k.a. Hiasl of Bavaria, a.k.a. der Bayerische Hiasl, a.k.a. da Boarische Hiasl
 Mathias Kneißl
 Hans Kohlhase

Greek
Klephtes
 Odysseas Androutsos
 Markos Botsaris
 Athanasios Diakos
 Geórgios Karaïskákis
 Theodoros Kolokotronis
 Nikitaras

Hungarian
 Rózsa Sándor (the most famous Hungarian highwayman)

Icelandic
 Gísli Súrsson
 Grettir Ásmundarson

Irish
 Grace O'Malley
 Redmond O'Hanlon
 Neesy O'Haughan
 Tiger Roche
 Captain Gallagher
 Thomas Blood – outlaw and attempted thief of the Crown Jewels

Italian
 Carmine Crocco (1830–1905) – Lucanian bandit and folk hero
 Salvatore Giuliano (1922–1950) – Sicilian bandit and separatist
 Giuseppe Musolino (1876–1956) – Calabrian outlaw and folk hero
 Ninco Nanco (1833–1864) – Lucanian bandit
 Nicola Napolitano (1838–1863) – Campanian bandit
 Gaspare Pisciotta (1924–1954) – Sicilian bandit and separatist
 Francesco Paolo Varsallona – Sicilian bandit leader

Norwegian
 Erik the Red

Polish
 Slovak bandit Juraj Jánošík is known in Polish folklore as Janiczek or Janicek

Serbian
 Jovo Stanisavljevic Caruga, Serb

Spanish
 Diego Corrientes Mateos Andalusian (1757–1781)
 El Guapo Andalusian (born 1546)  who is reputed to be the source for part one chapter 22 of Don Quixote by Cervantes.
 Eleuterio Sánchez Rodríguez (born April 15, 1942), known as El Lute, was at one time listed as Spain's "Most Wanted" criminal and later became a published writer.

Others
 Tadas Blinda, in Lithuania
 Juraj Jánošík, in Slovakia
 Johann Georg Grasel, in Moravia
 Andrij Savka, in Lemko Region; defender of the Lemkos against Polish and Hungarian nobility

Asians/Oceanian

Australian

In Australia two gangs of bushrangers have been made outlaws – that is they were declared to have no legal rights and anybody was empowered to shoot them without the need for an arrest followed by a trial.
 Ben Hall – the New South Wales colonial government passed a law in 1865 which outlawed the gang (Hall, John Gilbert and John Dunn) and made it possible for anyone to shoot them.  There was no need for the outlaws to be arrested and for there to be a trial — the law was essentially a bill of attainder.
 Ned Kelly – The Victorian colonial government passed a law on October 30, 1878, to make the Kelly gang outlaws: they no longer had any legal rights and they could be shot by anyone. The law was modelled on the 1865 legislation passed against the gang of Ben Hall. As well as Ned Kelly, his brother Dan Kelly was subject to the warrant as well as Joe Byrne and Steve Hart.

East Asian
 Song Jiang – Historical Chinese outlaw immortalised in the classic Water Margin
 Zhang Xianzhong – nicknamed Yellow Tiger, was a Chinese bandit and rebel leader who conquered Sichuan Province in the middle of the 17th century.
 Lao Pie-fang – known as Hun-hutze (red beard), was a bandit chieftain in western Liaoning.
 Wang Delin – bandit, soldier and leader of the National Salvation Army resisting the Japanese pacification of Manchukuo.
 Hong Gildong – Fictitious Korean outlaw
 Ishikawa Goemon – Legendary Japanese thief featured in kabuki plays
 Nezumi Kozō – Japanese thief
 Saigō Takamori – the last true Samurai, he led the Satsuma Rebellion
 Captain Harlock – protagonist of Space Pirate Captain Harlock

South Asian
 Dulla Bhatti – was a Punjabi who led a rebellion against the Mughal emperor Akbar. His act of helping a poor peasant's daughter to get married led to a famous folk take which is still recited every year on the festival of Lohri by Punjabis.
 Papadu – South Indian bandit.
 Veerappan, South India's most famous bandit, Elephant poacher, sandalwood smuggler
 Phoolan Devi – one of India's most famous dacoits ("armed robber").
 Saradiel – Known as the Robin Hood of Sri Lanka for his exploits under British Colonial rule.
 Shiv Kumar Patel – led one of the few remaining bands of outlaws that have roamed central India for centuries.
 Thuggee – Indian network of secret fraternities  engaged in murdering and robbing travellers.

Middle East
 Hashshashin – militant Ismaili Muslim sect, active from the 8th to the 14th centuries.
 Simko Shikak – Kurdish bandit and rebel leader.

Russian
 Nightingale the Robber – myth
 Yermak Timofeyevich – 16th century Cossack outlaw and explorer
 Stenka Razin – Cossack leader
 Yemelyan Pugachov – pretender to the Russian throne

Turkish
 İnce Memed, a legendary fictional character by Yaşar Kemal
 Atçalı Kel Mehmet Efe, an outlaw who led a local revolt against Ottoman Empire
 Çakırcalı Mehmet Efe, a powerful outlaw of late Ottoman era

Ukrainian
 Oleksa Dovbush
 Ustym Karmaliuk

References

 
 
Stock characters
Western (genre) staples and terminology